The Illinois High School Association (IHSA) celebrated 100 years of the IHSA State Tournament in the 2006-07 season.  A list of "100 Legends of the IHSA Boys Basketball Tournament" was assembled on December 14, 2005.  Throughout the state, 281 individuals were nominated and were chosen by geographic region and tournament era. The team of 100 Legends was selected by fans throughout the state with online voting. Several of the living members of that team made appearances at select games across the state, and signed a "Ball of Fame" which was subsequently raffled off at the state tournament.  The proceeds from the Ball of Fame raffle went to the Illinois School Activities Foundation, which annually awards scholarships to high school students from member schools.  Commemorative books and videos were available.

The following list contains the 100 members, their school, community and whether they were a player or coach.

Legends

References

High school sports in Illinois